Wang Chunli (born August 10, 1983 in Jilin) is a Chinese biathlete and cross-country skier. She competed for China at the 2006 Winter Olympics in cross-country skiing. She also competed in the biathlon for China at the 2010 Winter Olympics. Her only one world cup victory came in the 2008/09 season under a sprint. She won it in front of Tora Berger and Magdalena Neuner.

References

1983 births
Living people
Biathletes at the 2010 Winter Olympics
Chinese female biathletes
Chinese female cross-country skiers
Cross-country skiers at the 2006 Winter Olympics
Olympic biathletes of China
Olympic cross-country skiers of China
Sportspeople from Jilin City
Sport shooters from Jilin
Asian Games medalists in cross-country skiing
Cross-country skiers at the 2007 Asian Winter Games
Asian Games medalists in biathlon
Biathletes at the 2011 Asian Winter Games
Asian Games gold medalists for China
Asian Games silver medalists for China
Medalists at the 2011 Asian Winter Games
Skiers from Jilin
21st-century Chinese women